Canarium liguliferum is a species of plant in the Burseraceae family. It is endemic to the Solomon Islands.

References

Flora of the Solomon Islands (archipelago)
liguliferum
Data deficient plants
Endemic flora of the Solomon Islands
Taxonomy articles created by Polbot